Acanthodoxus is a genus of beetles in the family Cerambycidae, containing the following species:

 Acanthodoxus delta Martins & Monné, 1974
 Acanthodoxus machacalis Martins & Monné, 1974

References

Acanthocinini
Cerambycidae genera